Silantyev or Silantiev is a family name of East Slavic origin. The feminine forms are Silantyeva or Silantieva. The surname may refer to:

 Roman Silantyev, a Russian sociologist
 Alexander Petrovich Silantyev, a Soviet Air Force marshal
 Dennis Silantiev, a Ukrainian swimmer (world gold medal in 1998)

Russian-language surnames